Thesis is a 1961 album by the Jimmy Giuffre 3.

The trio on the recording was Giuffre's second drummerless group. He said at the time that the trio was “searching for a free sense of tonality and form”.

It was remastered, remixed and re-released by ECM in 1992 as a double-album with the trio's other 1961 Verve recording, Fusion (with three previously unissued tracks from the August sessions).

Track listing
"Ictus" (Carla Bley) - 2:44
"That's True, That's True" - 4:41
"Sonic" - 4:44
"Whirrrr" - 4:54
"Carla" (Paul Bley) - 4:35
"Goodbye" (Gordon Jenkins) - 4:56
"Flight" - 3:21
"The Gamut" - 4:37

Additional tracks on 1992 ECM reissue:

"Me Too" - 5:03
"Temporarily" (Carla Bley) - 6:09
"Herb & Ictus" - 0:44

All compositions by Jimmy Giuffre, except as otherwise noted.

Personnel
Jimmy Giuffre - clarinet
Paul Bley - piano
Steve Swallow - bass

References

1961 albums
Jimmy Giuffre albums
Albums produced by Creed Taylor
Verve Records albums
ECM Records albums